Loat or LOAT may refer to:

People
 Lily Loat (1880–1958), British anti-vaccination activist
 William Leonard Stevenson Loat (1871–1932), British archaeologist, naturalist, and collector

Other
 Trausdorf Airport (ICAO: LOAT), a former public airstrip in Trausdorf an der Wulka, Burgenland, Austria

See also
 David Loats (born 1981), former Australian rules footballer